The name Domeng has been used to name five tropical cyclones in the Philippines by PAGASA in the Western Pacific.

 Tropical Storm Jelawat (2006) (T0602, 03W, Domeng) – struck China
 Tropical Storm Domeng (2010) (Domeng) – passed through the Babuyan Islands
 Tropical Storm Peipah (2014) (05W, Domeng) – remained in the open ocean 
 Tropical Storm Maliksi (2018) (T1805, 06W, Domeng) – did not make landfall 
 Tropical Storm Aere (2022) (T2204, 04W, Domeng) - made landfall over Okinawa; later transitioned into a subtropical storm

Pacific typhoon set index articles